The 2022 Copa por México (officially Copa Sky for sponsorship reasons) was a football preseason exhibition tournament being held in preparation for the Clausura 2023 Liga MX season·

The tournament was originally being held in four different cities: Guadalajara, Mexico City, San Nicolás de los Garza, and Toluca. The final was scheduled to be held at at Estadio Jalisco in Guadalajara but was later moved to Estadio Akron in nearby Zapopan. The tournament featured ten teams, all eight who participated in the 2020 edition as well as Necaxa and Santos Laguna.

Cruz Azul won the tournament for the second straight time after defeating Guadalajara 0–2 in the final.

Venues

Teams
A total of ten clubs took part in the competition.
América
Atlas
Cruz Azul
Guadalajara
Mazatlán
Necaxa
Santos Laguna
Toluca
UANL
UNAM

Format
The ten clubs were divided into two groups of five. Each team will play each other at least once, playing a total of four matches. The winners of each group will advance to the final.

Group stage

Group A

Group B

Final

References

External links

2022 in Mexican sports
2022–23 in Mexican football